Tmesisternus riedeli is a species of beetle in the family Cerambycidae. It was described by Weigel in 2006. It is known from Papua New Guinea.

References

riedeli
Beetles described in 2006